Seven Reasons for Tears is a live performance album by Borbetomagus, released in 1989 by Purge/Sound League.

Track listing

Personnel 
Adapted from Seven Reasons for Tears liner notes.

Borbetomagus
 Don Dietrich – saxophone
 Donald Miller – electric guitar
 Adam Nodelman – bass guitar
 Jim Sauter – saxophone

Production and additional personnel
 Jacques Kralian – recording
 Kenn Michael – cover art
 Dana Vlcek – additional engineering

Release history

References

External links 
 

1989 live albums
Borbetomagus albums